Tilopteridales is an order of brown algae (class Phaeophyceae) with isomorphic alternation of generations.

References

External links 
 

 
Brown algae orders